

The Sopwith Admiralty Type 860 was a 1910s British biplane seaplane torpedo bomber designed and built for the Admiralty by the Sopwith Aviation Company.

Design and development
First flown in December 1914 the Type 860 was an unswept biplane. The upper wings had a strut braced extension and ailerons were fitted on all four wings. It had twin strut-mounted floats under the fuselage and a float mounted under the tail and each wingtip. Some models were powered by a nose-mounted 200 hp 14-cylinder engine; others used a 225 hp (168 kW) Sunbeam Mohawk engine. Both models utilised a two-bladed propeller. It had two tandem open cockpits and could carry one 810 lb (367 kg) torpedo under the fuselage.
The Sopwith Admiralty Seaplane Type 860 was built in two versions. The standard version had wings of equal span; the second version had a lower wing of shorter span. In both versions, the wings were designed to fold. The type remained in service with RNAS until at least 1916.

Operators

Royal Naval Air Service

Specifications

See also

References

Sopwith 860 – British Aircraft Directory

1910s British bomber aircraft
Type 860
Aircraft first flown in 1914